Steve Lightle (November 19, 1959 – January 8, 2021) was an American comics artist who worked primarily as a penciller. He was best known as the artist of DC Comics' Legion of Super-Heroes and Doom Patrol titles.

Biography
Steve Lightle attended the Johnson County Community College in the Kansas City metropolitan area. His first professional comic book work was a five-page story in Black Diamond #4 (Feb. 1984) published by AC Comics. He followed this with his debut at DC Comics, drawing a 10-page story in New Talent Showcase #4 (April 1984), a series intended to provide work for up-and-coming artists who did not have a regular assignment.

In 1984, Lightle followed Keith Giffen as the penciller of Legion of Super-Heroes. Lightle described it as being a "dream assignment" to work on the title. One of Lightle's issues featured the death of the longtime Legion member the Karate Kid. Although Lightle's tenure as interior artist was brief, he continued as the cover artist until 1988. Lightle co-created two Legionnaires, Tellus and Quislet, whose unusual appearances contrasted with the humanoid appearances of the other Legionnaires.

In 1986, Lightle was one of the contributors to the DC Challenge limited series and drew part of Batman #400 (Oct. 1986). The following year, he was the original penciller of the revival of Doom Patrol, but he left after the first five-issue story arc due to creative differences. Much of Lightle's work after that was as cover artist, typically inking his own penciled artwork. In 1989 and 1990, Lightle was the regular cover artist for Classic X-Men (later retitled X-Men Classic). He produced new covers and frontispieces to accompany the reprinted stories.

On January 8, 2021, Lightle's wife Marianne and son Matthew announced through social media that he had suddenly died from a cardiac arrest brought on by COVID-19 during the COVID-19 pandemic in Missouri. He was 61 years old.

Bibliography

AC Comics
 Black Diamond #4 (1984)

DC Comics

 Adventure Comics 80-Page Giant #1 (Superboy) (1998)
 Batman #400 (1986)
 Batman and the Outsiders #10 (1984)
 Booster Gold: Futures End #1 (2014)
 DC Challenge #12 (1986)
 Doom Patrol vol. 2 #1–5 (1987–1988)
 The Flash vol. 2 #226 (2005)
 The Flash 80-Page Giant #2 (1999)
 The Flash Annual #10 (1997)
 History of the DC Universe hardcover (three pages) (1988)
 JLA-Z #1 (one page) (2003)
 The Legion #24, 34 (2003–2004)
 Legion of Super-Heroes vol. 3 #3–5, 7–10, 12–14, 16, 23 (1984–1986)
 New Talent Showcase #4–6 (1984)
 The Outsiders #2–3 (backup stories) (1985–1986)
 Who's Who in the DC Universe #2–3, 6–7, 13–14 (1990–1991)
 Who's Who in the Legion of Super-Heroes #1–2 (1988)
 Who's Who: The Definitive Directory of the DC Universe #3, 5, 8, 12–13, 16, 18, 20, 23 (1985–1987)
 Who's Who: Update '87 #3–4 (1987)
 Wonder Woman Gallery #1 (1996)
 Wonder Woman Secret Files and Origins #1 (1998)
 World's Finest Comics #304, 306 (1984)

Marvel Comics

 The Amazing Spider-Man '96 #1 (1996)
 Excalibur: XX Crossing (1992)
 Generation X '95 #1 (1995)
 Marvel Comics Presents #109–116 (Wolverine and Typhoid Mary); #123–130 (Ghost Rider and Typhoid Mary); #132–136 (Wolverine); #150 (Vengeance, Wolverine, Daredevil, Typhoid Mary); #175 (Steel Raven, New Genix) (1992–1995)
 Marvel Holiday Special (Spider-Man) (1992)
 Quasar #39–40 (1992)
 Web of Spider-Man Super Special #1 (1995)
 X-Factor #32 (1988)

References

External links
 
 Steve Lightle at Mike's Amazing World of Comics
 Steve Lightle at the Unofficial Handbook of Marvel Comics Creators

1959 births
2021 deaths
20th-century American artists
21st-century American artists
American comics artists
DC Comics people
Johnson County Community College people
Marvel Comics people
People from the Kansas City metropolitan area
Deaths from the COVID-19 pandemic in Missouri